Frankenstein 1970 is a 1958 science fiction/horror film, shot in black and white CinemaScope, starring Boris Karloff and featuring Don "Red" Barry. The independent film was directed by Howard W. Koch, written by Richard Landau and George Worthing Yates, and produced by Aubrey Schenck. It was released theatrically in some markets on a double feature with Queen of Outer Space.

Plot 
Baron Victor von Frankenstein (Boris Karloff) has suffered torture and disfigurement at the hands of the Nazis as punishment for not cooperating with them during World War II. He nevertheless continues his work as a scientist. Needing funds to support his experiments, the Baron allows a television crew to shoot a horror film about his monster-making family at his castle in Germany.

This arrangement gives the Baron enough money to buy an atomic reactor, which he uses to create a living being, modeled after his own likeness before he had been tortured. When the Baron runs out of body parts for his work, he proceeds to kill off members of the crew, and even his faithful butler, for more spare parts. Finally, the Monster turns on the Baron, and they are both killed in a blast of radioactive steam from the reactor. After the reactor is shut down and the radiation falls to safe levels, the Monster's bandages are removed, and an audio tape is played back in which the Baron reveals that he had intended for the Monster to be a perpetuation of himself because he was the last of the Frankenstein family line.

Cast 
 Boris Karloff as Baron Victor von Frankenstein
 Tom Duggan as Mike Shaw
 Jana Lund as Carolyn Hayes
 Donald Barry as Douglas Row
 Charlotte Austin as Judy Stevens
 Irwin Berke as Inspector Raab
 Rudolph Anders as Wilhelm Gottfried
 Norbert Schiller as Schutter, Frankenstein's butler
 John Dennis as Morgan Haley
 Mike Lane as Hans Himmler / the Monster

Production
Producer Aubrey Schenck had a three-picture deal with Boris Karloff.

The movie was shot at the Warner Bros. studio in a mere eight days on a modest budget. The main set was borrowed from Too Much, Too Soon (1958).

The title Frankenstein 1970 was intended to add a futuristic touch. During preproduction, alternative titles included Frankenstein's Castle, Frankenstein 1960, and Frankenstein 2000.

Allied Artists released the film, after purchasing it for $250,000.

Reception
As of October 2022, the film carries a 4.9/10 score on IMDb.com

Home video

For years, the only home video release available of Frankenstein 1970 was a pan and scan version on VHS. In October 2009, Warner Bros. included the film on the DVD Karloff & Lugosi Horror Classics, along with three other movies. This release of Frankenstein 1970 features an audio commentary track by co-star Charlotte Austin and fan historians Tom Weaver and Bob Burns.

References

External links 

 

1958 films
1958 horror films
1950s science fiction horror films
Allied Artists films
CinemaScope films
American black-and-white films
American science fiction horror films
Frankenstein films
Films directed by Howard W. Koch
Films set in 1970
Films set in castles
Films set in Germany
Films set in the future
Films about filmmaking
Films scored by Paul Dunlap
1950s English-language films
1950s American films